Miss República Dominicana 1996 was held on December 16, 1995. There were 23 candidates, representing provinces and municipalities, who entered. The winner would represent the Dominican Republic at Miss Universe 1996 and Miss International 1996. The first runner up would enter Miss World 1996. The second runner up would enter in Reinado Internacional del Café 1996. The rest of finalist entered different pageants.
The contest was one of the most scandalous ever, when jury and crowd started screaming “ Fraud” at the end of the night. Judges claim to have voted unanimously for crowd favorite, Anneliese Ortiz Mirabal from Salcedo. At a press conference days later, she surrender all titles won during the competition and was then named “ La Reina del Pueblo”.

Results

Delegates

Miss Dominican Republic
1996 beauty pageants
1996 in the Dominican Republic